Julia Augusta may refer to:

Livia (58 BC–29 AD), Julia Augusta, Augustus' third wife
Agrippina the Younger (15–59 AD), Augusta, Claudius' fourth wife
Julia Domna (170-217), Augusta, wife of Septimius Severus
Julia Cornelia Paula, Elagabalus' first wife
Aquilia Severa Augusta, Elagabalus' second and fourth wife
Julia Avita Mamaea (died 235), Augusta, Severus Alexander's mother
Cornelia Salonina (died 268), Augusta, Gallienus' wife
Zenobia (240–?), empress of the Palmyrene Empire
Helena, Constantine I's mother

See also
 Augusta (title)